The Nile carp (Labeo niloticus) is a fish species in the genus Labeo. It feeds primary on plankton, and is distributed along the entire Nile valley. It is generally believed to be the fish that swallowed the phallus of the Egyptian god Osiris in the myth regarding his death at the hands of his brother Seth.

References 

Labeo
Fish described in 1758
Taxa named by Carl Linnaeus
Fauna of Egypt